The Centre for Public Policy is an Indian policy think tank engaged in research, training, teaching and capacity building. CPP is an initiative undertaken by the Indian Institute of Management Bangalore (IIMB) and is located within the IIMB's campus.

History
The CPP was established as a joint partnership venture agreement between the Department of Personnel and Training (DoPT), Government of India (GoI), the United Nations Development Programme (UNDP) and IIMB in 2000.

Overview
The Centre for Public Policy says that it:
 has pioneered the application of management disciplines for better public services and governance in India.
 runs the country’s leading Masters-level programme in public policy and management. The CPP's evidence-based research has focused on government innovations, regulation, policy making, administrative and organizational reform, public-private partnership and IT in government services and well as the Public sector.
 conducts various executive educational and doctoral programmes, such as the Post Graduate programme in Public Policy and Management (PGPPM).
 is a Centre of Excellence, as designated by Ministry of Housing and Urban Poverty Alleviation and the Ministry of Urban Development. 
 work in public policy is continuously being strengthened through strong collaborative networks and partnerships with other policy think tanks, policy professionals and practitioners around the world.

Public policy lab
Tumkur will become a policy lab for the implementation of urban-rural integration planning, urban governance, food safety, renewable energy and other projects.

Buildings
The centre has access to IIMB buildings, including its library with 1.7 lakh documents and computing envinroment. CPP also has its own general library collection.

References

Think tanks based in India
Indian Institute of Management Bangalore
2000 establishments in Karnataka
Think tanks established in 2000